Anália Maria Caldeira de Victória Pereira Simeão (3 October 1941 – 7 January 2009) was the leader of the PLD (the Partido Liberal Democrático, or "Liberal Democratic Party") of Angola and the most visible female politician in the country. She co-founded the PLD in 1983 while living in Portugal, and was its president until her death.

External links
Biography (PLD website)
Remains of PLD leader expected in Luanda - Angola Press

1941 births
2009 deaths
Angolan women in politics
Liberal Democratic Party (Angola) politicians
Political party founders
20th-century women politicians
21st-century Angolan women politicians
21st-century Angolan politicians